John Kitchen may refer to:

John Kitchen (English politician) (by 1507 – 1562), MP for Lancashire
John Joseph Kitchen (1911–1973), US federal judge
John Kitchen (musician) (born 1950), Scottish organist and music scholar